The 4th Annual Shorty Awards featured Ricky Gervias and Tiffani Thiessen. 1.6 million tweeted nominations were made across all the categories to honor the top users on Twitter, Facebook, Tumblr, Foursquare, YouTube and other internet platforms.

The ceremony took place on March 27, 2012 at the Times Center and was hosted by Samantha Bee and Jason Jones. The show began with welcomes from Anderson Cooper and Piers Morgan, with the Gregory Brothers performing live. Tracy Morgan was featured in a short video made for the ceremony. Mayor Mike Bloomberg accepted an award presented by Foursquare co-founder and CEO Dennis Crowley.

Fourth Annual Influencer Winners by category

Fourth Annual Brand Winners by category

Special Awards

References 

Shorty Awards
2012 in Internet culture